is the 31st single by Japanese entertainer Miho Nakayama. Written by Masato Odake, Nakayama, and Toshinobu Kubota, the single was released on May 17, 1995, by King Records.

Background and release
"Cheers for You" was arranged by American musicians Camus Celli and Andres Levin. The song was used by Kirin Company for their "Lager Beer Opening '95" commercial, which featured Nakayama. The music video was directed by Shunji Iwai; both Nakayama and Iwai had worked together in the 1995 film Love Letter.

"Cheers for You" peaked at No. 17 on Oricon's weekly singles chart, becoming her first single since "C" to miss the top 10. It sold over 127,000 copies and was certified Gold by the RIAJ.

Track listing

Charts

Certification

References

External links

1995 singles
1995 songs
Japanese-language songs
Miho Nakayama songs
King Records (Japan) singles
Songs written by Toshinobu Kubota